Vicente Reynés Mimó (born 30 July 1981 in Deià) is a Spanish former professional road bicycle racer, who rode professionally between 2003 and 2016 for the , , ,  and  teams.

Major results

2003
 4th Circuito de Getxo
 Vuelta a Mallorca
8th Trofeo Mallorca
10th Trofeo Alcudia
2004
 1st Stage 1 (TTT) Volta a Catalunya
 5th Clásica a los Puertos de Guadarrama
 9th Trofeo Mallorca
2005
 1st Stage 3 Paris–Nice
 3rd Trofeo Mallorca
 4th Overall Vuelta a Andalucía
2006
 5th Giro del Piemonte
2007
 Vuelta a Mallorca
1st Trofeo Cala Millor-Cala Bona
4th Trofeo Soller
5th Trofeo Calvià
9th Trofeo Mallorca
10th Trofeo Pollença
 1st Circuito de Getxo
 9th Milan–San Remo
2009
 10th Trofeo Mallorca
2010
 10th Ronde van het Groene Hart
2014
 5th Trofeo Ses Salines
 8th Paris–Bourges

References

External links

Palmarès at Trap-Friis.dk

Spanish male cyclists
Living people
1981 births
Sportspeople from Mallorca
Cyclists from the Balearic Islands